Pre-crime (or precrime) is the idea that the occurrence of a crime can be anticipated before it happens. The term was coined by science fiction author Philip K. Dick, and is increasingly used in academic literature to describe and criticise the tendency in criminal justice systems to focus on crimes not yet committed.  Precrime intervenes to punish, disrupt, incapacitate or restrict those deemed to embody future crime threats. The term precrime embodies a temporal paradox, suggesting both that a crime has not yet occurred and that it is a foregone conclusion.

Origins of the concept
George Orwell introduced a similar concept in his 1949 novel Nineteen Eighty-Four using the term thoughtcrime to describe illegal thoughts which held banned opinions about the ruling government or intentions to act against it.  A large part of how it differs from precrime is in its absolute prohibition of anti-authority ideas and emotions, regardless of the consideration of any physical revolutionary acts.  However, Orwell was describing behaviour he saw in governments of his day as well as extrapolating on that behaviour, and so his ideas were themselves rooted in real political history and current events.

In Philip K. Dick's 1956 science fiction short story "The Minority Report", Precrime is the name of a criminal justice agency, the task of which is to identify and eliminate persons who will commit crimes in the future. The agency’s work is based on the existence of "precog mutants", a trio of "vegetable-like" humans whose "every incoherent utterance" is analyzed by a punch card computer. As Anderton, the chief of the Precrime agency, explains the advantages of this procedure: "in our society we have no major crimes ... but we do have a detention camp full of would-be criminals". He cautions about the basic legal drawback to precrime methodology: "We’re taking in individuals who have broken no law."

The concept was brought to wider public attention by Steven Spielberg's film Minority Report, loosely adapted from the story. The Japanese cyberpunk anime television series Psycho-Pass has a similar concept.

In criminological theory
Precrime in criminology dates back to the positivist school in the late 19th century, especially to Cesare Lombroso's idea that there are "born criminals", who can be recognized, even before they have committed any crime, on the basis of certain physical characteristics. Biological, psychological and sociological forms of criminological positivisms informed criminal policy in the early 20th century. For born criminals, criminal psychopaths and dangerous habitual offenders eliminatory penalties (capital punishment, indefinite confinement, castration etc.) were seen as appropriate. Similar ideas were advocated by the Social Defense movement and, more recently, by what is seen and criticized as an emerging "new criminology" (Feeley & Simon 1992) or "actuary justice" (Feeley & Simon 1994). The new "precrime" or "security society" requires a radically new criminology.

Testing for pre-delinquency
Richard Nixon's psychiatrist, Arnold Hutschnecker, suggested, in a memorandum to the then president, to run mass tests of "pre-delinquency" and put those juveniles in "camps". Hutschnecker, a refugee from Nazi Germany and a vocal critic of Hitler at the time of his exodus, has rejected the interpretation of the memorandum that he advocated concentration camps:

In criminal justice practice

The frontline of a modern criminal justice system is increasingly preoccupied with anticipating threats, and is the antithesis of the traditional criminal justice system's focus on past crimes. Traditionally, criminal justice and punishment presuppose evidence of a crime being committed. This time-honored principle is violated once punishment is meted out "for crimes never committed". Today, a clear example of this trend is "nachträgliche Sicherungsverwahrung" (retrospective security detention), which became an option in German criminal law in 2004. This "measure of security" can be decided upon at the end of a prison sentence on a purely prognostic basis. In France, a similarly retrospective measure was introduced in 2008 as "rétention de sûreté" (security detention). The German measure was viewed as violating the European Convention on Human Rights by the European Court of Human Rights in 2009. It was, however, never completely abolished in Germany and new legislation is envisaged to continue this practice under the new name "Therapieunterbringung" (detention for therapy).. A similar provision for indefinite administrative detention was found in Finnish law, but it was not enforced after the mid-1970s. Precrime is most obvious and advanced in the context of counter-terrorism, though it is argued that, far from countering terrorism, precrime produces the futures it purports to prevent.

In 2020, the Tampa Bay Times compared the Pasco County Sheriff's Office precrime detection program to the film Minority Report, citing pervasive monitoring of suspects and repeated visits to their homes, schools and places of employment.

Current techniques 
Specialist software now exists for crime-prediction by analysing data.

This type of software has allowed law enforcement agencies to form predictions about criminal behavior and identify potential criminal hotspots based on crime data. 

However, crime prediction software has also faced heavy criticism from academics, privacy, and civil liberties groups due to concerns about the lack of evidence proving the technology’s reliability and accuracy. 

Another criticism of crime prediction software is that crime prediction algorithms often use racially skewed data in their analysis. This can potentially lead law enforcement agencies to make decisions and predictions that unfairly target and label minority communities as at risk for criminal activity. 

A widely used criminal risk assessment tool called the Correctional Offender Management Profiling for Alternative Sanctions, or COMPAS, has been used by police and judges to predict the risk of recidivism amongst more than 1 million offenders since its development in 1998. The software predicts the likelihood that a convicted criminal will reoffend within two years based upon data including 137 of the individuals physical features and past criminal records. 

A study published in Science Advances by two researchers found that groups of randomly chosen people could predict whether a past criminal would be convicted of a future crime with about 67 percent accuracy, a rate that was extremely similar to COMPAS.

Although COMPAS does not explicitly collect data regarding race, a study testing its accuracy on more than 7000 individuals arrested in Broward County, Florida showed substantial racial disparities in the software’s predictions. 

The results of the study showed that Black defendants who did not reoffend after their sentence were incorrectly predicted by COMPAS software to recidivate at a rate of 44.9%, as opposed to white defendants who were incorrectly predicted to reoffend at a rate of 23.5%. In addition, white defendants were incorrectly predicted to not be at risk of recidivism at a rate of 47.7%, as opposed to their Black counterparts who were incorrectly predicted to not reoffend at a rate of 28%. The study concluded that the COMPAS software appeared to overpredict recidivism risk towards Black individuals while underpredicting recidivism risk towards their white counterparts.

See also
 Bureau of Alcohol, Tobacco, Firearms and Explosives fictional sting operations
 Habeas corpus
 Incapacitation (penology)
 Predictive policing
 Presumption of guilt
 Preventive detention
 Preventive state
 Thoughtcrime
 Total Information Awareness

Notes

References
 Anttila, Inkeri (1975), Incarceration for Crimes never Committed, Helsinki.
 Dick, Philip K. (2002), "Minority Report", In: Minority Report, London, 1-43. See The Minority Report
 Feeley, Malcolm/Simon, Jonathan (1992), "The new penology: notes on the emerging strategy of corrections and its implications" In. Criminology, vol. 30, 449-74
 Feeley, Malcolm/Simon, Jonathan (1994): "Actuarial Justice: the emerging new criminal law". In: David Nelken (ed.) The Futures of Criminology, London.
 Feest, Johannes (2015), "Abolition in the times of pre-crime. A view from Germany". In: Thomas Mathiesen, The Politics of Abolition Revisited. Milton Park & New York. 
 Fitzgibbon, D.W. (2004), Pre-emptive Criminalization; Risk Control and Alternative Futures. London.
 Hutschnecker, Arnold (1988), Letter to the Editor (Nixon-Era Plan for Children didn’t include Concentration Camps), New York Times, 15.10.1988.
 
 
 Zedner, Lucia (2014), "Preventive Detention of the Dangerous". In: Andrew Ashworth/Luica Zedner/Patrick Tomlin (eds.) Prevention and the limits of the Criminal Law. Oxford University Press, 144-170.
 
 Zedner, Lucia (2009),  Security. London, 72 ff.
 Zedner, Lucia (2007), "Pre-crime and post-criminology?". In: Theoretical Criminology, vol. 11, no. 2, 261–281.

Criminal law
Criminology
Prevention